Edinburgh University Basketball Club are a basketball club based at the University of Edinburgh in the city of Edinburgh, Scotland.

Men
The University's men's team have a long history in Scottish basketball, winning the Scottish Cup on four occasions between 1949 and 1965. They competed in National League Division 1 for a total of six seasons, 1 season in 2007-08 and five seasons from 2014 to 2019. Their strongest finish was a 3rd place achieved in 2016. The team withdrew from the National League at the end of the 2018-19 season, although they still compete annually in the Scottish Cup.

Honours
Scottish Cup (1949, 1950, 1960, 1965)

Season-by-season records

Women

Honours
Scottish Cup (2016, 2018)
National League Champions (2016)
National League Playoffs Champions (2016, 2018)

Season-by-season records

External links

Basketball teams in Scotland
Clubs and societies of the University of Edinburgh
Sports teams in Edinburgh